Ohio's 9th senatorial district has historically been a minority majority district based in urban Cincinnati.  Currently it comprises central Hamilton County.  It encompasses Ohio House districts 31, 32 and 33.  It has a Cook PVI of D+18.  Its current Ohio Senator is Democrat Catherine Ingram.  She resides in Cincinnati, a city located in Hamilton county.

List of senators

External links
Ohio's 9th district senator at the 130th Ohio General Assembly official website

Ohio State Senate districts